The United States was the host nation for the 1960 Winter Olympics in Squaw Valley, California.

History

Medalists 

The following U.S. competitors won medals at the games. In the by discipline sections below, medalists' names are bolded. 

| width="78%" align="left" valign="top" |

| width=22% align=left valign=top |

Alpine skiing

Men

Women

Biathlon

Cross-country skiing

Figure skating

Individual

Mixed

Ice hockey

Summary

Roster

First round
Top two teams (shaded ones) from each group advanced to the final round and played for 1st-6th places, other teams played in the consolation round.

USA 7-5 Czechoslovakia
USA 12-1 Australia

Medal round
First place team wins gold, second silver and third bronze.

USA 6-3 Sweden
USA 9-1 Germany (UTG)
USA 2-1 Canada
USA 3-2 USSR
USA 9-4 Czechoslovakia

Nordic combined

Ski jumping

Speed skating

Men

Women

References

Official Olympic Reports
 
 Olympic Winter Games 1960, full results by sports-reference.com

Nations at the 1960 Winter Olympics
1960
Oly
1960 in sports in California